Sardari Berd (: deriven from Sardar ; a title of Persian origin, used for military or political leaders meaning "commander" or "chieftain" and Berd ; meaning "fortress".) sits on the right before the cemetery in the village of Sardarapat in the Armavir Province  of Armenia.

History 
The fortress was built sometime between the years of 1807-1828, during the rule and with the assistance of Sardar Hosein Qoli Khan Qajar (Sardari Iravani), the last and best of the Persian Qajar governors of the Yerevan Khanate. It was constructed using stones taken from the ruins of the ancient city of Armavir, some of which still bear traces of Urartian cuneiform inscriptions. The fortress was used as an administrative center for the Sardarapat district and also as the summer residence of the Khan of Yerevan (Erevan).

Sardari Berd was captured in 1828 by the Russians under General Ivan Paskevich during the Russo-Persian War (1826-1828),  despite strong defense by Hasan Khan Sardari Iravani, brother to Sardar Hosein Qoli Khan. Speaking of Paskevich in a British War Office summary, the following passage reads:

The region formally passed from Persian sovereignty to a Russian one after the Treaty of Turkmenchay in 1828. Armavir became the Serdarabad uyezd of the Armenian Oblast, which itself became the Erivan guberniya in 1840. This situation lasted until the February Revolution in 1917. Of the fortress almost nothing remains. Most of it was dismantled to build Soviet Armenia.

References

See also 
 Armavir, Armenia
 Hoktember, Armenia
 Sardarapat Memorial, commemorating the Battle of May 22–26, 1918.

External links 

Archaeological sites in Armenia
Castles in Armenia
Forts in Armenia
Buildings and structures in Armavir Province
Erivan Khanate
Persian-Caucasian architecture
Qajar castles